The Miser is a 1733 comedy play by the British writer Henry Fielding. It is an English-language adaptation of Molière's The Miser. It was a success, running for twenty five performances by May 1733.

The original Drury Lane cast included Benjamin Griffin as Lovegold, Roger Bridgewater as Frederick, William Mills as Clerimont, Theophilus Cibber Ramilie, James Oates as Decoy, Edward Berry as Sparke and Christiana Horton as Mariana.

References

Bibliography
 Downie, J.A. A Political Biography of Henry Fielding. Routledge, 2015.

1733 plays
West End plays
Comedy plays
Plays by Henry Fielding
Plays based on works by Molière